is a railway station on the Fujikyuko Line in the city of Tsuru, Yamanashi, Japan, operated by Fuji Kyuko (Fujikyu).

Lines

Station layout
The station is staffed and consists of two side platforms serving two tracks. Passengers cross the tracks between the platforms via a level crossing. It has a waiting room and toilet facilities.

Adjacent stations

History
Tanokura Station opened on 19 June 1929.

Passenger statistics
In fiscal 1998, the station was used by an average of 752 passengers daily.

Surrounding area
 Mount Kuki

See also
 List of railway stations in Japan

References

External links

 Fujikyuko station information 

Railway stations in Yamanashi Prefecture
Railway stations in Japan opened in 1929
Stations of Fuji Kyuko
Tsuru, Yamanashi